The 2020 Houston Astros season was the 59th season for the Major League Baseball (MLB) franchise in Houston, Texas, their 56th as the Astros, eighth in the AL West division, and 21st at Minute Maid Park. The team entered the season as the defending champions of the American League.

The season was shortened to a 60-game schedule due to the ongoing COVID-19 pandemic. The 2020 All-Star Game was also canceled due to the delayed start to the season.

On September 25, by virtue of a loss by the Los Angeles Angels, the Astros clinched a playoff berth, making it their fourth consecutive postseason appearance, as well as their fifth in the last six years. The Astros finished the regular season 29–31, becoming the second American League team to reach the playoffs with a losing record, the first being the 1981 Kansas City Royals. They received the No. 6 seed in the newly expanded playoffs. On September 30, the Astros became the first sub-.500 team to win a playoff series, eliminating the Minnesota Twins in a two-game sweep in the Wild Card Series. The Astros advanced to the American League Division Series where they defeated the Oakland Athletics three games to one, batting in a historic 33 runs (and 12 home runs) across 35 innings. They then advanced to their fourth consecutive American League Championship Series, where they lost to the Tampa Bay Rays in seven games despite nearly completing a dramatic comeback in forcing a Game 7 after trailing three games to none.

After the season, pitcher Cristian Javier was named a finalist for the 2020 AL Rookie of the Year Award, finishing third in voting.

COVID-19 effects on season 
On March 12, 2020, MLB announced that because of the ongoing COVID-19 pandemic, the start of the regular season would be delayed by at least two weeks in addition to the remainder of spring training being cancelled. Four days later, it was announced that the start of the season would be pushed back indefinitely due to the recommendation made by the CDC to restrict events of more than fifty people for eight weeks. On June 23, commissioner Rob Manfred unilaterally implemented a 60-game season. Players reported to training camps on July 1 in order to resume spring training and prepare for a July 24 Opening Day.

Offseason

Sign-stealing controversy 
For years, some individuals on other teams had suspected the Astros of stealing signs, but there was no public reporting on the subject until November 2019, when The Athletic reporters Ken Rosenthal and Evan Drellich at The Athletic published an article detailing the team's activities. Mike Fiers, a pitcher who played for the Astros in 2017, told The Athletic that the organization used a video camera in center field to film the opposing catcher's signals to the pitcher regarding the next pitch. Astros players or team staffers watching the live camera feed behind the dugout used various audio cues to signal to the batter what type of pitch was coming next. MLB opened an investigation into the allegations and confirmed in January 2020 that the Astros illegally used a camera system to steal signs during the 2017 regular season and postseason, during which they won the World Series, as well as in part of the 2018 regular season. MLB found no evidence of illicit sign stealing in the 2019 season, in which the Astros advanced to the World Series but lost.

As a result, Astros general manager Jeff Luhnow and field manager A. J. Hinch were suspended for the entire 2020 season for failing to prevent the rules violations. The Astros were fined the maximum allowable $5 million and forfeited their first- and second-round picks in the 2020 and 2021 drafts. No players were punished because they had been given immunity by MLB in exchange for their cooperation. The Astros subsequently fired both Luhnow and Hinch on the day their suspensions were announced. MLB's investigation also determined that Boston Red Sox manager Alex Cora helped mastermind the Astros' sign stealing while serving as Hinch's bench coach in 2017; Boston and Cora mutually parted ways the following day, and MLB later suspended Cora through the 2020 postseason. Carlos Beltrán was the only Astros player from 2017 who was specifically named in the report; he had been hired to manage the New York Mets in November 2019 but parted ways with the team after the results of MLB's investigation were announced.

Coaching staff changes
 On December 7, 2019, first base coach Don Kelly departed for the position of bench coach with the Pittsburgh Pirates, joining the coaching staff of newly hired manager Derek Shelton. The first base coach position went to Omar Lopez, a long-time manager in the Astros' minor league system.
 On January 13, Astros owner Jim Crane fired Jeff Luhnow and A. J. Hinch, after both were implicated in MLB's investigation into the Houston Astros' sign stealing scandal. Crane temporarily assumed control of baseball operations while a search was ongoing for new personnel.
 On January 29, the Astros hired Dusty Baker as the new manager for the 2020 season with an option for 2021.

Releases and departures
 On December 18, 2019, the New York Yankees announced they had signed RHP Gerrit Cole to a 9-year contract, which was rumored to be worth $324 million, the fourth-richest contract in MLB history. Cole had elected free agency at the conclusion of the 2019 season, and had rejected a $17.8 million qualifying offer from the Astros to return for 2020.

Signings
 Astros signed C Dustin Garneau to a 1-year contract
 Astros re-signed RHP Joe Smith to a 2-year contract
 Astros re-signed C Martín Maldonado to a 2-year contract
 Astros signed RHP Jared Hughes to a minor league contract

Regular season

Game log

|- style="background:#cfc;"
| 1 || July 24 || Mariners || 8–2 || Verlander (1–0) || Gonzales (0–1) ||—|| Minute Maid Park || 1–0
|- style="background:#cfc;"
| 2 || July 25 || Mariners || 7–2 || McCullers Jr. (1–0) || Walker (0–1) ||—|| Minute Maid Park || 2–0
|- style="background:#fbb;"
| 3 || July 26 || Mariners || 6–7 || Altavilla (1–0) || Devenski (0–1) || Williams (1) || Minute Maid Park || 2–1
|- style="background:#cfc;"
| 4 || July 27 || Mariners || 8–5 || Bielak (1–0) || Graveman (0–1) || Osuna (1) || Minute Maid Park || 3–1
|- style="background:#fbb;"
| 5 || July 28 || Dodgers || 2–5 || Graterol (1–1) || Valdez (0–1) || Jansen (1) || Minute Maid Park || 3–2
|- style="background:#fbb;"
| 6 || July 29 || Dodgers || 2–4  || Santana (1–0) || Sneed (0–1) ||—|| Minute Maid Park || 3–3
|- style="background:#cfc;"
| 7 || July 31 || @ Angels || 9–6 || Bielak (2–0) || Andriese (0–1) || Scrubb (1) || Angel Stadium || 4–3
|-

|- style="background:#fbb;"
| 8 || August 1 || @ Angels || 4–5  || Buchter (2–0) || Rodríguez (0–1) ||—|| Angel Stadium || 4–4
|- style="background:#cfc;"
| 9 || August 2 || @ Angels || 6–5  || Taylor (1–0) || Barnes (0–2) ||—|| Angel Stadium || 5–4
|- style="background:#cfc;"
| 10 || August 4 || @ Diamondbacks || 8–2 || Javier (1–0) || Bumgarner (0–2) ||—|| Chase Field || 6–4
|- style="background:#fbb;"
| 11 || August 5 || @ Diamondbacks || 7–14 || Ray (1–2) || McCullers Jr. (1–1) ||—|| Chase Field || 6–5
|- style="background:#fbb;"
| 12 || August 6 || @ Diamondbacks || 4–5 || Guerra (1–0) || Pressly (0–1) ||—|| Chase Field || 6–6
|- style="background:#fbb;"
| 13 || August 7 || @ Athletics || 2–3  || Wendelken (1–0) || Sneed (0–2) ||—|| RingCentral Coliseum || 6–7
|- style="background:#fbb;"
| 14 || August 8 || @ Athletics || 1–3 || Montas (2–1) || Valdez (0–2) || Hendriks (5) || RingCentral Coliseum || 6–8
|- style="background:#fbb;"
| 15 || August 9 || @ Athletics || 2–7 || Luzardo (1–0) || Javier (1–1) || Smith (1) || RingCentral Coliseum || 6–9
|- style="background:#cfc;"
| 16 || August 10 || Giants || 6–4 || McCullers Jr. (2–1) || Webb (1–1) || Pressly (1) || Minute Maid Park || 7–9
|- style="background:#fbb;"
| 17 || August 11 || Giants || 6–7  || Gott (1–0) || Sneed (0–3) || Rogers (1) || Minute Maid Park || 7–10
|- style="background:#cfc;"
| 18 || August 12 || Giants || 5–1 || Greinke (1–0) || Baragar (2–1) ||—|| Minute Maid Park || 8–10
|- style="background:#cfc;"
| 19 || August 14 || Mariners || 11–1 || Valdez (1–2) || Cortés Jr. (0–1) ||—|| Minute Maid Park || 9–10
|- style="background:#cfc;"
| 20 || August 15 || Mariners || 2–1 || Javier (2–1) || Margevicius (0–1) || Pressly (2) || Minute Maid Park || 10–10
|- style="background:#cfc;"
| 21 || August 16 || Mariners || 3–2 || Pressly (1–1) || Swanson (0–2) ||—|| Minute Maid Park || 11–10
|- style="background:#cfc;"
| 22 || August 17 || Rockies || 2–1 || Bielak (3–0) || Freeland (2–1) || Taylor (1) || Minute Maid Park || 12–10
|- style="background:#cfc;"
| 23 || August 18 || Rockies || 2–1  || Scrubb (1–0) || Díaz (0–1) ||—|| Minute Maid Park || 13–10
|- style="background:#cfc;"
| 24 || August 19 || @ Rockies || 13–6 || Valdez (2–2) || Castellani (0–1) ||—|| Coors Field || 14–10
|- style="background:#cfc;"
| 25 || August 20 || @ Rockies || 10–8 || Raley (1–0) || Márquez (2–4) || Pressly (3) || Coors Field || 15–10
|- style="background:#fbb;"
| 26 || August 21 || @ Padres || 3–4 || Guerra (1–0) || McCullers Jr. (2–2) || Pagán (1) || Petco Park || 15–11
|- style="background:#fbb;"
| 27 || August 22 || @ Padres || 2–13 || Davies (4–2) || Bielak (3–1) ||—|| Petco Park || 15–12
|- style="background:#fbb;"
| 28 || August 23 || @ Padres || 3–5 || Stammen (3–1) || Paredes (0–1) || Pagán (2) || Petco Park || 15–13
|- style="background:#cfc;"
| 29 || August 24 || Angels || 11–4 || Valdez (3–2) || Sandoval (0–4) ||—|| Minute Maid Park || 16–13
|- style="background:#cfc;"
| 30 || August 25  || Angels || 6–3  || Javier (3–1) || Suárez (0–2) || Pressly (4) || Minute Maid Park || 17–13
|- style="background:#fbb;"
| 31 || August 25  || Angels || 5–12  || Peña (2–0) || Bielak (3–2) ||—|| Minute Maid Park || 17–14
|- style="background:#bbb;"
|—|| August 26 || Angels || colspan=8 | Postponed (Hurricane Laura); Makeup: September 5
|- style="background:#bbb;"
|—|| August 28 || Athletics || colspan=8 | Postponed (strikes due to shooting of Jacob Blake); Makeup: August 29
|- style="background:#cfc;"
| 32 || August 29  || Athletics || 4–2  || McCullers Jr. (3–2) || Bassitt (2–2) || Pressly (5) || Minute Maid Park || 18–14
|- style="background:#cfc;"
| 33 || August 29  || Athletics || 6–3  || Greinke (2–0) || Montas (2–3) || Pressly (6) || Minute Maid Park || 19–14
|- style="background:#bbb;"
|—|| August 30 || Athletics || colspan=8 | Postponed (COVID-19); Makeup: September 8
|-

|- style="background:#fbb;"
| 34 || September 1 || Rangers || 5–6  || Hernández (5–0) || Taylor (1–1) || Montero (7) || Minute Maid Park || 19–15
|- style="background:#cfc;"
| 35 || September 2 || Rangers || 2–1 || Javier (4–1) || Allard (0–4) || Pressly (7) || Minute Maid Park || 20–15
|- style="background:#cfc;"
| 36 || September 3 || Rangers || 8–4 || Greinke (3–0) || Lynn (4–2) ||—|| Minute Maid Park || 21–15
|- style="background:#fbb;"
| 37 || September 4 || @ Angels || 5–6  || Andriese (2–2) || Raley (0–1) ||—|| Angel Stadium || 21–16
|- style="background:#fbb;"
| 38 || September 5  || @ Angels || 9–10  || Peña (3–0) || Paredes (1–2) ||—|| Angel Stadium || 21–17
|- style="background:#fbb;"
| 39 ||   || Angels || 6–7  || Ramirez (1–0) ||  || Buttrey (5) || Angel Stadium || 21–18
|- style="background:#fbb;"
| 40 || September 6 || @ Angels || 5–9 || Mayers (1–0) || Valdez (3–3) ||—|| Angel Stadium || 21–19
|- style="background:#fbb;"
| 41 || September 7 || @ Athletics || 0–6 || Bassitt (3–2) || Javier (4–2) ||—|| RingCentral Coliseum || 21–20
|- style="background:#fbb;"
| 42 ||   || Athletics || 2–4  || Montas (3–3) || Greinke (3–1) || Hendriks (11) || RingCentral Coliseum || 21–21
|- style="background:#cfc;"
| 43 || September 8  || @ Athletics || 5–4  || Paredes (2–2) || Wendelken (1–1) || Pressly (8) || RingCentral Coliseum || 22–21
|- style="background:#fbb;"
| 44 || September 9 || @ Athletics || 2–3 || Hendriks (3–0) || Pressly (1–2) ||—|| RingCentral Coliseum || 22–22
|- style="background:#fbb;"
| 45 ||  || @ Athletics || 1–3 || Manaea (4–2) || Urquidy (0–1) || Hendriks (12) || RingCentral Coliseum || 22–23
|- style="background:#cfc;"
| 46 || September 12 || @ Dodgers || 7–5 || James (1–0) || Jansen (3–1) || Pressly (9) || Dodger Stadium || 23–23
|- style="background:#fbb;"
| 47 || September 13 || @ Dodgers || 1–8 || González (3–0) || Greinke (3–2) ||—|| Dodger Stadium || 23–24
|- style="background:#cfc;"
| 48 || September 15 || Rangers || 4–1 || Urquidy (1–1) || Goody (0–1) || Pressly (10) || Minute Maid Park || 24–24
|- style="background:#fbb;"
| 49 || September 16 || Rangers || 0–1 || Gibson (2–5) || Pressly (1–3) ||—|| Minute Maid Park || 24–25
|- style="background:#cfc;"
| 50 || September 17 || Rangers || 2–1 || Valdez (4–3) || Lyles (1–5) || Raley (1) || Minute Maid Park || 25–25
|- style="background:#fbb;"
| 51 || September 18 || Diamondbacks || 3–6 || Gallen (2–2) || García (0–1) || Crichton (4) || Minute Maid Park || 25–26
|- style="background:#cfc;"
| 52 || September 19 || Diamondbacks || 3–2 || Paredes (3–2) || Weaver (1–8) || Pressly (11) || Minute Maid Park || 26–26
|- style="background:#cfc;"
| 53 || September 20 || Diamondbacks || 3–2 || Taylor (2–1) || Guerra (1–2) || Pressly (12) || Minute Maid Park || 27–26
|- style="background:#fbb;"
| 54 || September 21 || @ Mariners || 1–6 || Gonzales (7–2) || McCullers Jr. (3–3) ||—|| T-Mobile Park || 27–27
|- style="background:#cfc;"
| 55 || September 22 || @ Mariners || 6–1 || Valdez (5–3) || Sadler (1–2) ||—|| T-Mobile Park || 28–27
|- style="background:#fbb;"
| 56 || September 23 || @ Mariners || 2–3 || Margevicius (2–3) || Greinke (3–3) || Hirano (4) || T-Mobile Park || 28–28
|- style="background:#cfc;"
| 57 || September 24 || @ Rangers || 12–4 || Javier (5–2) || Lynn (6–3) ||—|| Globe Life Field || 29–28
|- style="background:#fbb;"
| 58 || September 25 || @ Rangers || 4–5  || Martin (1–1) || Paredes (3–3) ||—|| Globe Life Field || 29–29
|- style="background:#fbb;"
| 59 || September 26 || @ Rangers || 1–6 || Herget (1–0) || Bielak (3–3) ||—|| Globe Life Field || 29–30
|- style="background:#fbb;"
| 60 || September 27 || @ Rangers || 4–8 || Benjamin (2–1) || De Jong (0–1) ||—|| Globe Life Field || 29–31
|-

|- style="text-align:center;"
| Legend:       = Win       = Loss       = PostponementBold = Astros team member

Season standings

Record vs. opponents

Roster

Postseason

Game log

|- style="background:#cfc;" 
| 1 || September 29 || @ Twins || 4–1 || Valdez (1–0) || Romo (0–1) || — || Target Field || 1–0
|- style="background:#cfc;"
| 2 || September 30 || @ Twins || 3–1 || Javier (1–0) || Stashak (0–1) || Pressly (1) || Target Field || 2–0 
|-

|- style="background:#cfc;"
| 1 || October 5 || @ Athletics || 10–5 || Taylor (1–0) || Wendelken (0–1) || — || Dodger Stadium || 1–0
|- style="background:#cfc;"
| 2 || October 6 || @ Athletics || 5–2 || Valdez (1–0) || Manaea (0–1) || Pressly (1) || Dodger Stadium || 2–0
|- style="background:#fbb;"
| 3 || October 7 || Athletics || 7–9 || Hendriks (1–0) || Raley (0–1) || — || Dodger Stadium || 2–1
|- style="background:#cfc;"
| 4 || October 8 || Athletics || 11–6 || Javier (1–0) || Montas (0–1) || — || Dodger Stadium || 3–1
|-
| colspan=9|
|-

|- style="background:#fbb;"
| 1 || October 11 || @ Rays || 1–2 || Snell (1–0) || Valdez (0–1) || Castillo (1) || Petco Park || 0–1
|- style="background:#fbb;"
| 2 || October 12 || @ Rays || 2–4 || Morton (1–0) || McCullers Jr. (0–1) || Anderson (1) || Petco Park || 0–2
|- style="background:#fbb;"
| 3 || October 13 || Rays || 2–5 || Yarbrough (1–0) || Urquidy (0–1) || Castillo (2) || Petco Park || 0–3
|- style="background:#cfc;"
| 4 || October 14 || Rays || 4–3 || Greinke (1–0) || Glasnow (0–1) || Pressly (1) || Petco Park || 1–3
|- style="background:#cfc;"
| 5 || October 15 || Rays || 4–3 || Pressly (1–0) || Anderson (0–1) || — || Petco Park || 2–3
|- style="background:#cfc;"
| 6 || October 16 || @ Rays || 7–4 || Valdez (1–1) || Snell (1–1) || Pressly (2) || Petco Park || 3–3
|- style="background:#fbb;"
| 7 || October 17 || @ Rays || 2–4 || Morton (2–0) || McCullers Jr. (0–2) || Fairbanks (1) || Petco Park || 3–4
|-
| colspan=9| 
|-

Wild Card Series 

The Astros played the Twins in the Wild Card series at Target Field in Minneapolis, Minnesota.

Game 1, September 29 at Target Field
Zack Greinke got the ball for the Astros against Twins ace Kenta Maeda. Greinke pitched four innings, allowing 1 run. Framber Valdez relieved Greinke in the 5th inning, and pitched 5 scoreless innings. Meanwhile, George Springer tied the game with an RBI single, and the Astros scored 3 runs in the 9th off Sergio Romo & Caleb Thielbar.

Game 2, September 30 at Target Field 
José Urquidy got the ball for the Astros against José Berríos. Urquidy pitched  innings, allowing 1 run, and was relieved by lefty Brooks Raley. Twins DH Nelson Cruz was the only source of offense for the Twins, as he drove in both runs for the Twins in the series. Cristian Javier pitched 3 scoreless innings, while Carlos Correa provided a go-ahead home run and the Astros got a 2 run single from breakout star Kyle Tucker. Pressly closed it out in the 9th inning to send the Astros to the ALDS.

American League Division Series 

The Astros faced their division rivals, the Oakland Athletics, in the ALDS. Due to the continuing COVID-19 pandemic, all games of the series were played at Dodger Stadium in Los Angeles.

Game 1, October 5 at Dodger Stadium
The Astros announced that Lance McCullers Jr. would get the ball for game one against A's ace Chris Bassitt. A's DH Khris Davis got the scoring started with a two-run home run in the second inning, followed by a Sean Murphy solo shot in the third. The Astros responded with a solo home run from Alex Bregman and a game-tying home run from Carlos Correa in the top of the fourth. The A's responded quickly with a solo shot from Matt Olson to put the A's back in front, 4–3. Both starters lasted four innings. A Mark Canha sacrifice fly extended the A's lead to 5–3 in the fifth. The Astros took the lead in the sixth, when Josh Reddick reached on a fielding error with two outs and Martín Maldonado singled. George Springer then doubled to score Reddick José Altuve followed it up with a double to drive in both Maldonado and Springer giving the Astros a 6–5 lead. Michael Brantley singled in Altuve to make it 7–5. Correa hit his second home run of the game in the seventh to make it 8–5. The Astros then broke it open in the ninth inning with a Correa RBI single and a Yuli Gurriel sacrifice fly. Ryan Pressly worked a 1–2–3 ninth inning to seal the Game 1 victory for the Astros 10–5.

Game 2, October 6 at Dodger Stadium
Left-handed pitcher Framber Valdez started game two of the series against A's left hander Sean Manaea. A's DH Khris Davis hit another home run to give the A's the lead in the second inning. The Astros fought back and took the lead when George Springer hit a two-run home run in the third. The Astros added another run on a Correa RBI groundout in the fourth moving the lead to 3–1. The A's countered with a Chad Pinder solo home run in the fourth to narrow the lead to 3–2. Martín Maldonado and Springer hit back-to-back home runs in the fifth inning to push the Astro's lead to 5–2. Ryan Pressly picked up the save for the Astros as they moved the A's to the edge of elimination with a 2–0 game lead in the series.

Game 3, October 7 at Dodger Stadium
José Urquidy started Game 3 for Houston, while the A's started Jesús Luzardo. A's second baseman Tommy La Stella got the scoring started with a solo home run in the first inning. The Astros responded with a solo home run from José Altuve and a Correa RBI groundout to take the lead in the bottom of the first. The A's responded again with a solo home run from left fielder Mark Canha to tie the game at two. The A's took the lead in the fourth inning on a Matt Olson solo home run.. The A's would pushed the lead to two with a Marcus Semien solo shot in the fifth. However, Houston tied it in the bottom of the fifth inning with an Aledmys Díaz two-run home run. The Astros retook the lead later in the inning with a Michael Brantley RBI single, an Alex Bregman RBI double, and a Kyle Tucker RBI single. Trailing 7–4, the A's tied it in the top of the seventh on a Chad Pinder three-run home run. The A's added two more runs in the eighth inning to cap the scoring. A's closer Liam Hendriks pitched three scoreless innings to save the A's season and send the series to a Game 4.

Game 4, October 8 at Dodger Stadium
The A's started Frankie Montas while the Astros started Zack Greinke. A's outfielder Ramón Laureano got the scoring started with a three-run home run in the second. The Astros responded in the fourth inning with a two-run home run from Michael Brantley and a three-run home run by Carlos Correa. Trailing 5–3, the A's pulled within one on another home run from Laureano that chased Greinke from the game. Lefty Blake Taylor came in and got the final out of the fifth inning. In the bottom of the fifth, Brantley hit his secondnd home run of the game and Correa added an RBI single to make it 7–4. In the sixth, Kyle Tucker added an RBI single followed by another run-scoring single by Correa that to move the lead to 9–4. José Altuve added a two-run home run in the seventh to make it 11–4 Astros. The A's attempted to mount a comeback in the ninth when Marcus Semien drove in a run on a single and Tommy La Stella singled in Semien before Astros closer Ryan Pressly shut the door in the ninth to send the Astros to the ALCS.

American League Championship Series 

The Astros faced the No. 1-seeded Tampa Bay Rays in the ALCS. Due to the continuing COVID-19 pandemic, all games of the best-of-seven series were played at Petco Park in San Diego, California.

Game 1, October 11 at Petco Park 
The Astros started left-hander Framber Valdez, while the Rays started to left-hander Blake Snell in game one of the series The Astros got the scoring started with a solo home run from José Altuve in the first inning. The Rays tied it on a solo home run from Randy Arozarena in the fourth inning and took the lead in the fifth inning on a Mike Zunino RBI single.  Blake Snell pitched five innings and allowed only one run. Valdez pitched six innings, giving up two runs on four hits. The Rays' bullpen pitched four scoreless innings in relief as the Rays held on for the 2–1 victory. The win gave the Rays a 1–0 lead in the series.

Game 2, October 12 at Petco Park 
The Astros started right hander Lance McCullers Jr., while the Rays started right hander Charlie Morton. The Rays got the scoring started with a 3-run home run from outfielder Manuel Margot. The Astros got on the board with a solo home run from shortstop Carlos Correa. The Rays added 1 more run from catcher Mike Zunino. The Astros started a rally in the 9th against Rays closer Nick Anderson, but only managed 1 run as the Astros fell into a 0–2 hole in the ALCS.

Game 3, October 13 at Petco Park
The Rays started left-hander Ryan Yarbrough, while the Astros started right-hander José Urquidy in Game 3 of the series with the Astros becoming the home team. The Astros took another early lead on a José Altuve home run in the first. Still leading by one in the sixth, the Rays pushed across six runs on a two-run scoring single by Joey Wendle. A hit batter drove in another run and a double with the bases loaded by Hunter Renfroe gave the Rays a 5–1 lead. A Michael Brantley home run in the sixth pulled the Astros within three, but they could must no further as they lost their third straight game. The loss moved the Astros to the edge of elimination in a 3–0 series hole.

Game 4, October 14 at Petco Park
The Rays started right hander Tyler Glasnow, while the Astros countered with Zack Greinke. The Astros took an early lead with another first inning home run from José Altuve and then added another run on an Altuve RBI double in the third. The Rays tied it at two in the fourth inning on an Randy Arozarena home run. George Springer hit a go-ahead two-run home run in the bottom of the fifth. The Rays drew within a run on a Willy Adames run-scoring double in the top of the ninth. Ryan Pressly was able to get the final out and move the series to Game 5 with the Astros trailing three-games-to-one.

Game 5, October 15 at Petco Park
The Rays started Game 5 with an opener in right-hander John Curtiss, while the Astros started rookie right-hander Luis García. The Astros, in their last game as the home team in the series, got the scoring started with a leadoff home run in the bottom of the first from George Springer. The Rays tied it on a Brandon Lowe solo homer  in the third. However, the Astros answered and took the lead in the bottom of the third with a two-run single from Michael Brantley. The Rays narrowed the lead to one with another home run from Randy Arozarena in the fifth. With only six outs remaining in the game, the Rays tied it in the top of the eighth on a Ji-man Choi solo home run. With the game still tied in the bottom of the ninth inning, Carlos Correa homered to straight away center field to give the Astros the 4–3 win and extend the series to a Game 6.

Game 6, October 16 at Petco Park
Game 1 starter Framber Valdez started Game 6, while Blake Snell opposed him. The Rays got the scoring started with a Willy Adames RBI double. The Astros took the lead with a George Springer 2-run single, a José Altuve RBI double, and a Carlos Correa RBI single. Kyle Tucker added his first career postseason home run to make it a 5-1 Astros lead. The Astros took a 7–1 lead with a Michael Brantley RBI single & a Tucker sac fly. The Rays got back into the game with 2 home runs from Manuel Margot. Pressly shut the door in the 9th to force a Game 7 and make the Astros the 2nd team in MLB history to force a Game 7 after being down 3–0 in the series (The 2004 Red Sox are the other team).

Game 7, October 17 at Petco Park 
The Astros started Game 2 starter Lance McCullers Jr., while the Rays started Game 2 starter Charlie Morton. The Rays struck first on a 2-run home run from Randy Arozarena in the 1st. Catcher Mike Zunino added a solo home run to make 3-0 Rays in the 2nd. Zunino then added a sac fly in the 6th to make it 4–0. The Astros got on the board with a 2-run single from Carlos Correa. Pete Fairbanks shut the door in the 9th to send the Rays to the World Series and eliminate the Astros.

Postseason rosters

| style="text-align:left" | 
Pitchers: 21 Zack Greinke 39 Josh James 43 Lance McCullers Jr. 53 Cristian Javier 55 Ryan Pressly 58 Brooks Raley 59 Framber Valdez 60 Enoli Paredes 62 Blake Taylor 65 José Urquidy 67 Cy Sneed 70 Andre Scrubb
Catchers: 11 Garrett Stubbs 13 Dustin Garneau 15 Martín Maldonado
Infielders: 1 Carlos Correa 2 Alex Bregman 9 Jack Mayfield 10 Yuli Gurriel 16 Aledmys Díaz 27 José Altuve 31 Abraham Toro
Outfielders: 3 Myles Straw 4 George Springer 20 Chas McCormick 22 Josh Reddick 30 Kyle Tucker 
Designated hitters: 23 Michael Brantley
|- valign="top"

| style="text-align:left" |
Pitchers: 21 Zack Greinke 39 Josh James 43 Lance McCullers Jr. 53 Cristian Javier 55 Ryan Pressly 58 Brooks Raley 59 Framber Valdez 60 Enoli Paredes 62 Blake Taylor 65 José Urquidy 67 Cy Sneed 70 Andre Scrubb 77 Luis García
Catchers: 11 Garrett Stubbs 13 Dustin Garneau 15 Martín Maldonado
Infielders: 1 Carlos Correa 2 Alex Bregman 10 Yuli Gurriel 16 Aledmys Díaz 27 José Altuve 31 Abraham Toro
Outfielders: 3 Myles Straw 4 George Springer 20 Chas McCormick 22 Josh Reddick 30 Kyle Tucker 
Designated hitters: 23 Michael Brantley
|- valign="top"

| style="text-align:left" | 
Pitchers: 21 Zack Greinke 39 Josh James 43 Lance McCullers Jr. 53 Cristian Javier 55 Ryan Pressly 58 Brooks Raley 59 Framber Valdez 60 Enoli Paredes 62 Blake Taylor 65 José Urquidy 67 Cy Sneed 69 Chase De Jong 70 Andre Scrubb 77 Luis García
Catchers: 11 Garrett Stubbs 13 Dustin Garneau 15 Martín Maldonado
Infielders: 1 Carlos Correa 2 Alex Bregman 10 Yuli Gurriel 16 Aledmys Díaz 27 José Altuve 31 Abraham Toro
Outfielders: 3 Myles Straw 4 George Springer 22 Josh Reddick 30 Kyle Tucker 
Designated hitters: 23 Michael Brantley
|- valign="top"

Farm system

Charitable efforts during Coronavirus pandemic
As of mid-April 2020, Astro teammates Carlos Correa and Martin Maldonado, along with fellow Major Leaguers such as Francisco Lindor and Eddie Rosario, as well as musical stars, have already shipped 26 pallets of medical supplies to the U.S. territory of Puerto Rico. Astros owner Jim Crane has waived all shipping and logistic charges through his company Crane Worldwide Logistics.

See also

 List of Major League Baseball annual triples leaders
 List of Major League Baseball franchise postseason streaks

References

External links
 Houston Astros season official site 
 2020 Houston Astros season at Baseball Reference

Houston Astros seasons
Houston Astros
Houston Astros